Dr. Scott X. Mao is the John Swanson Endowed Professor at the Swanson School of Engineering of the University of Pittsburgh.  He is a specialist in the research on plasticity, deformation physics and fracture mechanics of materials, and atomic scale experimental mechanics. He is well-known for work with in-situ transmission electron microscope and is amongst the most cited in the field (over 16,500 citations, H-index=65).

He serves as Editor in Chief for International Journal of Metallurgy and Metal Physics, and Editor for Advances in Metallurgical and Material Engineering. He is an  Elected Fellow of the Canadian Academy of Engineering, an elected American Physical Society fellow, Elected Fellow of IAAM (International Association of Advanced Materials) and ASME fellow.

Education
Post - Doc., Mechanical Behaviour of Materials, Massachusetts Institute of Technology, 1989
Ph.D, Mechanical Engineering, Tohoku University, 1988
B.Sc., Solid Mechanics, Beijing University of Aeronautics, 1982

References 

Living people
University of Pittsburgh faculty
Fellows of the Canadian Academy of Engineering
Fellows of the American Physical Society
Year of birth missing (living people)
Place of birth missing (living people)
Massachusetts Institute of Technology alumni
Tohoku University alumni
Beihang University alumni
Mechanical engineers